Aquilegia elegantula is a species of columbine known by the common name western red columbine. It is native to the southwestern United States, particularly the Four Corners states, and northern Mexico, where it grows in moist areas in mountain coniferous forests. It is a rhizomatous perennial herb growing 10 t 60 centimeters tall. The green leaf blades are borne on long, slender petioles and divided into three leaflets which each have rounded lobes along the front edges. The flower has five long petals up to 3 centimeters in length including their elongated, knob-tipped spurs. The petals are bright red in the spurs and lighten to yellow-green or orange at the tips. Between the petals are the oval-shaped sepals, which are reddish to yellowish in color and are held parallel to the petals. Flowers often droop such that the mouth is toward the ground and the spurs point up; the flowers are pollinated by the broad-tailed hummingbird (Selasphorus platycercus).

References

External links
Flora of North America

elegantula